Castelló de Farfanya is a municipality in the comarca of the Noguera in Catalonia, Spain. 
 
It is home to remains of a medieval castle owned by the Counts of Urgell.

References

 Panareda Clopés, Josep Maria; Rios Calvet, Jaume; Rabella Vives, Josep Maria (1989). Guia de Catalunya, Barcelona: Caixa de Catalunya.  (Spanish).  (Catalan).

External links
Official website
 Government data pages 

Municipalities in Noguera (comarca)
Populated places in Noguera (comarca)